Mulberry Grove is a historic mansion in Donaldsonville, Louisiana, U.S.. It was designed in the Greek Revival architectural style, and it was built in 1836 for Dr Duffel.

It was subsequently purchased by German-born John B. Reuss, who made it part of his Germania Plantation. Reuss's daughter, who inherited the Mulberry Grove part of Germania Plantation, sold it to Mrs C. C. Clifton in 1951. In the late 1980s, Mrs. Clifton sold the plantation house, after a restoration work, to Lawrence J. Noel III & Allen T. Noel.

The mansion, along with a water cistern and four quarters houses located shortly to the east, have been listed on the National Register of Historic Places on October 14, 1993.

References

See also
National Register of Historic Places listings in Ascension Parish, Louisiana

Houses on the National Register of Historic Places in Louisiana
Greek Revival architecture in Louisiana
Houses completed in 1836
Houses in Ascension Parish, Louisiana
Plantations in Louisiana